The Kendal Mountain Festival is an annual festival held in November in Kendal, Cumbria on the edge of the English Lake District in the UK and is one of the most diverse festivals of its kind in the world, attracting film premières from around the world. The current festival patrons are Sir Chris Bonington and Leo Houlding. As a result of the COVID-19 pandemic, it celebrated its 40th anniversary in 2020 in a completely online event.

Description

Filmmakers, TV producers, adventurers, top brands, athletes and speakers gather to take part in four days of films, talks, books and exhibitions covering all aspects of mountain and adventure sports culture. It is also the main social event for outdoor enthusiasts in the UK. The British Mountaineering Council states that it "is by far the largest and most varied event of its type in Europe and it's the main social event for outdoor enthusiasts in the UK."

The heart of the programme is the International Film Competition where 100 films are screened (from 400 entries), with thirteen category prizes available. The genres include culture, environment, action sports, exploration and short-form documentaries, as well as a comprehensive speaker programme of over 100 guests each year.

Other events that form part of the festival include the Kendal Mountain Literature Festival; speakers focus on mountains, landscape, nature and the sense of place in the only festival of its kind in the UK. The festival also hosts the Boardman Tasker Prize for Mountain Literature.

The festival invests money into its community outreach and schools programme, such as remote screenings, Kendal for Schools programmes and free family adventure programmes. Extra expenditure into the local economy generated by the Kendal Mountain Festival has been independently calculated to be in excess of £4m. The festival has even been cited by The Sunday Times as one of the reasons young people are attracted to Kendal as a place to live. The Kendal Mountain Festival 'mission' is 'to inspire more people to explore, enjoy and represent mountains, wilderness and their cultures'.

Robert Macfarlane, the festival patron, states: "The Festival celebrates the relations between people and places – between landscapes and the human heart – as they play out in culture and especially in literature. Its many and varied events seek to emphasise connection and community in an age of division."

References

External links 

https://vimeo.com/mountainfestival
https://filmfreeway.com/festival/KendalMountain
http://www.openadventure.com/kmf/

Climbing in England
Festivals in Cumbria
Film festivals in England
Kendal
Mountaineering festivals
Mountaineering in the United Kingdom